Honorable Deputy Judge President Patricia Lynette Goliath (born 15 October 1964) is a judge of the High Court of South Africa and the Deputy Judge President of the Western Cape High Court. Deputy Judge President Goliath acted as a Constitutional Justice at the Constitutional Court of South Africa for 1 year in 2018.

Early life and education
Goliath was born in Cape Town and matriculated at Athlone High School in 1982. She received her tertiary education at the University of the Western Cape where she graduated with a BA and a LLB. She then obtained an LL.M. and a Certificate in Labour Law at the University of Cape Town. She also obtained a Diploma in Insolvency Law at the University of Pretoria.

Career
Deputy Judge President Goliath was admitted as an attorney in 1990. She has served on various committees of the Cape Law Society, such as the criminal law and pro bono committees and has also served as an examiner for the lawyers' entrance examination. She was appointed judge to the Western Cape High Court on the 1st of January 2006. In 2016 she was appointed the successor to Justice Jeanette Traverso as the Deputy Judge President of the Western Cape High Court. During 2018, she sat as acting Justice at the Constitutional Court of South Africa.

References

1964 births
Living people
20th-century South African lawyers
21st-century South African judges
South African women judges
21st-century women judges